Ham and egg bun is a type of Hong Kong pastry.  It is a bun or bread that contains a sheet of egg and ham.  It is commonly found in Hong Kong as well as some Chinatown bakery shops overseas. It is also a common meal in Brazil, simply called a sandwich.

See also
Beef bun
Cuban sandwich
Bánh mì
 Ham and eggs
St. Paul sandwich
 List of sandwiches
 List of ham dishes
 List of pork dishes
 List of buns

References

External links
Ham and egg bun on Ma Wan

Hong Kong breads
Ham dishes
Egg sandwiches
Pork sandwiches